Gar Baxter (16 February 1930 – 15 August 2022) was a Canadian football player who played for the Winnipeg Blue Bombers. He previously played for the Winnipeg Rods.

In 1956, he left the Blue Bombers after missing a season due to an injury. 

Baxter died on 15 August 2022, aged 92.

References

1930 births
2022 deaths
Winnipeg Blue Bombers players
Canadian football people from Winnipeg